WOBM (1160 AM) is a radio station licensed to Lakewood Township, New Jersey and broadcasting a country music format. The station is owned by Townsquare Media and serves the Monmouth County area.

History
The station sign-on was November 20, 1970 and it was originally a daytime-only operation on 1170 kHz, using the call letters WHLW (for Howell and Lakewood Townships). Early in its existence, it became a Top 40 station calling itself 11-7 Radio, featuring such disc jockeys as John Collure, Paul Irwin, Jack Tracksler, Charlie Roberts, Jay Sorensen, and Joey Reynolds. The station became WOBM in 1981, and in early 1988 moved to the 1160 frequency and became a 24-hour operation. At the time, the station was owned by North Shore Broadcasting Partners, which was affiliated with WOBM-FM's ownership group, Seashore Broadcasting.

During the late 1980s, WOBM was known as "1160 AM Star Country" and featured a country music format and New York Mets baseball games. Local airstaff at the time included general manager Kevin Buckelew, (son of co-owner Joseph Buckelew and known on-air as Kevin Carr), Tom Maciazak, Ava Holly and Kevin Hodge, although most of the programming was satellite-delivered. The station also simulcast Bob Levy's "Topic A" program on Sunday mornings from the sister FM station. Levy had originated the program while general manager of WOBM-AM-FM and continued the program after retiring from the position in the late 1980s. At the time, programming and ad sales operations emanated from WOBM's studios and transmitter site at 46 Clayton Road in Howell Township, just off Route 9.

In the 1990s, WOBM adopted an MOR format, and added Bob Levy and his wife Marianne as local morning hosts. Outside of the local morning show, WOBM featured Dial Global's syndicated "Adult Standards" format, known on-air by the handle America's Best Music.

On September 3, 2010 WOBM changed its format and branding to "Good-Time Oldies", and began simulcasting on 1310 WADB.

The WOBM News/Townsquare Media News team includes bureau chief Thomas Mongelli and morning anchor Dianne DeOliveira.

On May 19, 2014 WOBM changed their format from oldies to news/talk.

On January 3, 2017 WOBM changed their format from news/talk to oldies, branded as "Beach Radio".

On December 12, 2019 the station's translator at 93.5 signed off and on December 29, 2019 its new translator on 104.1 signed on.

On February 1, 2022 at 10 a.m., after playing "Thunder Road" by Bruce Springsteen, WOBM changed their format from oldies to country, branded as "Cat Country 96.7/104.1", with the first song being "Cold as You" by Luke Combs.

References

External links

OBM (AM)
Country radio stations in the United States
Townsquare Media radio stations